is a translation of the Gospel of Luke from the Biblical Greek into Jamaican Patois. The work was spearheaded by the Bible Society of West Indies, headquartered in Kingston, Jamaica. The translation was published in print and audio formats in summer 2010. The  Project falls within the Bible Society of the West Indies' larger translation endeavour, known as the Jamaican Creole Translation Project.

Example
A translation of Luke 1:28, when the angel Gabriel first visits the virgin Mary.

<div style="font-style:italic">

</div style>

References

External links
jamaicanbible.org - Creole Bible translation project

Bible versions and translations
Christianity in Jamaica
Jamaican literature
Gospel of Luke
2012 books